Wolf Creek is a creek in geographic Maisonville Township in the Unorganized West Part of Timiskaming District in northeastern Ontario, Canada. It is in the James Bay drainage basin and is a right tributary of the Whiteclay River.

The creek begins at an unnamed marsh and flows north through Highspot Lake, then northeast through Goose Egg Lake to Wolf Lake. It continues northeast, passes under the Ontario Northland Railway (ONR) line, and reaches its mouth at the Whiteclay River. The Whiteclay River flows via the Black River, the Abitibi River and the Moose River to James Bay.

References

Other map sources:

Rivers of Timiskaming District